André Berthon (1882–1968) was a French politician. He served as a member of the Chamber of Deputies from 1919 to 1932.

References

1882 births
1968 deaths
People from Gironde
Politicians from Nouvelle-Aquitaine
French Section of the Workers' International politicians
French Communist Party politicians
Members of the 12th Chamber of Deputies of the French Third Republic
Members of the 13th Chamber of Deputies of the French Third Republic
Members of the 14th Chamber of Deputies of the French Third Republic